The Birmingham Street Railway was a streetcar operator in Birmingham, Alabama from 1884 to 1890. It merged along with several other companies (Highland Avenue and Belt Railroad, East Lake Land Company, East Birmingham Land Company, Bessemer and Birmingham Railroad, and Enselt Company) to form the Birmingham Railway and Electric Company in 1890.

References
 bjcta.org Historical

Defunct Alabama railroads
Companies based in Birmingham, Alabama
Transportation in Alabama
Defunct public transport operators in the United States